The Nanoracks Bishop Airlock is a commercially-funded airlock module launched to the International Space Station on SpaceX CRS-21 on 6 December 2020. It was berthed to the Tranquility module on 19 December 2020 by the Canadarm2. The module was built by Nanoracks, Thales Alenia Space, and Boeing. It is used to deploy CubeSats, small satellites, and other external payloads for NASA, Center for the Advancement of Science in Space (CASIS), and other commercial and governmental customers. NASA plans on using the airlock as a brand new way to dispose large pieces of trash. The name refers to the bishop chess piece, which moves diagonally.

Background 
Under the International Space Station's designation as a facility of the Center for the Advancement of Science in Space, Nanoracks has an agreement with NASA to send payloads from academic and private sources for installation on the ISS' experiment racks or deployment from the equipment airlock in the Japanese Kibō module. Limitations on NASA's use of the JAXA facility created a bottleneck, prompting Nanoracks to develop their own airlock to increase satellite deployment capabilities. NASA also uses the Bishop Airlock to dispose of trash. Astronauts and cosmonauts simply dump their trash via the airlock and the trash is thrown out and burned up in the atmosphere of Earth. This helps out the chronic problem of having to keep trash inside all of the modules for months at a time while waiting for a cargo spacecraft to dump the trash.

A Space Act Agreement between NASA and Nanoracks to develop a private airlock was signed in May 2016, and the Nanoracks–Boeing plan to build and launch the module by 2019 was approved in February 2017. Originally manifested to launch on SpaceX CRS-19 in late 2019, the module was later re-manifested to launch on SpaceX CRS-21.

Manufacturing 
The Bishop Airlock was primarily manufactured by Nanoracks, with parts of the titanium and aluminium pressure shell made by Thales Alenia Space at their factory in Turin, Italy. Boeing manufactured the stainless steel exterior panels and Common Berthing Mechanism (CBM). The partly-made components were shipped to Kennedy's Space Station Processing Facility for completion, assembly and testing.

Airlock 
The airlock is a four-cubic meter bell-shaped canister that attaches to the Tranquility module. It does not have hatches, instead the Canadarm2 connects to either of the two grapple fixtures in order to move the airlock on or off the station's berthing port which does have a hatch.

The second grapple fixture allows the airlock and its contents to be carried along the main truss on the Mobile Base System.

Airlock operations at ISS 
Typical Airlock Sortie for satellite deployment:

 Payload satellite and deployer loaded into Airlock – Crew
 SSRMS grapple of Airlock – Ground
 Transfer of Airlock power from Node 3 to SSRMS - Ground
 Airlock power and data cables, IMV, and EWC coax cable disconnect – Crew
 Install CBM Controller Panel Assemblies - Crew
 Hatch closure and Air Save Pump hookup to hatch Equalization Valve – Crew
 Air Save Pump depress – Ground
 Vestibule residual air depress – Ground
 CBM bolt disengage – Ground
 SSRMS maneuver to deploy position – Ground
 Satellite deployment – Ground
 SSRMS maneuver back to Node 3 Port and berth Airlock (without CBCS) – Ground
 Air Save Pump repress and leak check – Ground
 Open Hatch – Crew
 Relocate CBM Controller Panel Assemblies - Crew
 Reconnect power and data cables, IMV, and EWC coax cable to Airlock – Crew
 Transfer of Airlock power from SSRMS to Node 3 - Ground
 SSRMS ungrapple - Ground
 Remove payload deployer hardware left behind and stow - Crew

References 

Components of the International Space Station
Spacecraft launched in 2020
SpaceX payloads contracted by NASA
2020 in the United States